In a Space Outta Sound is the fifth studio album by Nightmares on Wax. It was released in 2006 on Warp. It peaked at number 93 on the UK Albums Chart.

Critical reception

At Metacritic, which assigns a weighted average score out of 100 to reviews from mainstream critics, the album received an average score of 64, based on 13 reviews, indicating "generally favorable reviews".

Track listing

Charts

References

External links
 

2006 albums
Nightmares on Wax albums
Warp (record label) albums